Verdigris Technologies is a venture-backed artificial intelligence technology start-up founded in 2011 by Mark Chung, Thomas Chung, and Jonathan Chu, headquartered in the NASA Ames Research Center in the center of Silicon Valley. Verdigris is an AI-powered, IIoT cleantech platform for energy management in commercial and industrial smart buildings. Verdigris' technology utilizes proprietary hardware, AI, and software applications to deliver insights about building operations and enable energy savings. In 2017, Fast Company named Verdigris one of the world's 10 Most Innovative Companies in Energy. Based on the concepts of Nonintrusive load monitoring, the Verdigris energy platform monitors every electrical device in a building by means of monitoring the electrical feeds coming off of the building's circuit panel. Verdigris provides data, actionable insights, and automation to help commercial facilities managers increase the energy efficiency of their buildings. Areas that Verdigris works to impact include: reducing power usage during peak hours; identifying motor problems that could be using excess energy; and detecting equipment faults before they occur.

Verdigris' customers include hotels, corporate offices, agriculture and food producers, and manufacturers. Early customers included the City of San Jose, Autodesk, and Netflix. Today, Verdigris has over 500 systems deployed in the Americas, Europe, the Middle East, Africa, and Asia. Notable current customers include Jabil Circuit, Vention Medical, The W Hotel San Francisco (Starwood Hotels), The Orchard Hotel in San Francisco, and The Marriott Marquis in Washington, DC.

Till date, Verdigris has raised about $15 million in venture funding. Verdigris raised $6.7 million in an October 2016 venture capital round that was led by contract manufacturer Jabil and Verizon Ventures.

Product versions 

The most recent (5th generation) version of the Verdigris energy platform, Einstein, was formally launched on August 30, 2016, with a live demo at the Jabil Blue Sky Center in San Jose, California.
According to Engineering.com, “Verdigris claims that Einstein differs from their previous hardware because it is more straightforward to install, and it has an integrated cellular radio. Previous equipment from the company required an attachment to an external data connectivity system.”

Services 

“We provide analytics and workflow automation to 24/7 facilities teams to improve operational efficiency, reduce equipment downtime, and save on energy, delivered as a SaaS,” said co-founder Thomas Chung to TechCrunch in March 2016.

Verdigris smart sensors clamp onto electrical circuits to track a building's energy consumption and send the data securely over Wi-Fi or Verizon 4G/LTE to the cloud. Its sensors take hundreds of millions more data points than utility smart meters—every hour. This enables Verdigris AI technology and algorithms to “learn” a building's equipment over time.

Verdigris claims its sensors take hundreds of millions more data points per hour than a utility smart meter. Verdigris uses smart sensors that attach to a building's electrical panel wiring. This allows Verdigris artificial technology and algorithms to “learn” about a building.

Verdigris has three analytics products:
Web dashboard to provide insights on a building's energy consumption.
Tracker, a configurable mobile app, to send alerts 
Lobby dashboard, a visual presentation of the building's energy use that can be displayed on a screen in a building's lobby.

Verdigris forecasting for demand management uses a deep learning recurrent neural network model. It reads a building's energy usage in real-time, and, combined with weather or building occupancy, produces a probability distribution for estimated power consumption (kW).

The Verdigris system is certified for use in 38 countries including the United States, the European Union (32 countries), China, Malaysia, Mexico, India and Canada.

Company history
Verdigris co-founder and CEO Mark Chung came up with the idea for Verdigris when he returned home from vacation to a massive electricity bill. The local utility could not provide Chung with an itemized utility bill to show where he spent the extra electricity. Chung bought inexpensive kilowatt meters, hacked them to be wi-fi enabled, and built an electrical map to monitor every appliance in his house. He found the problem, a broken pool pump, and thought of a business idea to map commercial buildings that use a lot of energy.

Verdigris participated in the Stanford accelerator, StartX, and as one of the StartX Notable Companies, was invested in by Stanford University. Verdigris was also one of the 10 inaugural winners of the Founder.org competition and was invested in by Founder.org Capital. NASA was also an early backer of Verdigris, and the two organizations have collaborated on projects including the Sustainability Base at Ames Research Center. Verdigris is headquartered at the NASA Ames Research Park in Moffett Federal Airfield in Mountain View, California.

In December 2016, GreenBiz called Verdigris one of the ten companies to watch in the area of smart buildings. CBInsights named Verdigris to the 2017 AI 100 list, recognizing the 100 most promising private artificial intelligence companies globally. In 2017, Fast Company named Verdigris one of the 10 Most Innovative Companies in Energy.

The name ‘Verdigris’ references the green patina that forms on copper left outside. “Copper is the elemental infrastructure of every single building in the world, what all of our electricity runs on,” said Chung. “And what we have as a company mission is this desire to expose that to the world and make it green."

References

External links 
 Verdigris Joins Building Monitor Disaggregator Fray, Inks PG&E Agreement - greentechmedia.com

American companies established in 2011
Software companies based in the San Francisco Bay Area